Triportheidae is a family of characiform fishes, including about 23 species. This family was raised from the status of a subfamily to family based on extensive analysis of characiform species.

References

Characiformes
Ray-finned fish families